The Zaildar was the officer in charge of a Zail, a revenue and administrative unit in the colonial rural administration of Punjab in British India. , comprising between two and forty villages.

List of Zaildars

Bidhwan Jaglan Zaildar
Bidhwan Jaglan Zail (बिधवान जागलान ज़ैल) was headquartered in the Bidhwan (बिधवान) village and ruled by the Jaglan clan. It covered four villages in Erstwhile Loharu State in the Hisar district. These villages, Bidhwan, Kalali (कलाली), Mandholi Khurd (मंढोली खुर्द) and Siwach lie in Bhiwani district. The Zail and Zaildar systems were abolished in 1952, and the Jaglan family now continues as Lambardar.

References

History of Punjab, India
History of Haryana